Mikhaylovsky (masculine), Mikhaylovskaya (feminine), or Mikhaylovskoye (neuter) may refer to:

People
Mikhaylovsky (last name), last name of Slavic origin (includes a list)

Places
Mikhaylovsky District, several districts in Russia
Mikhaylovskoye Urban Settlement, several municipal urban settlements in Russia
Mikhaylovsky, Russia (Mikhaylovskoye, Mikhaylovskaya), several rural localities in Russia
Mikhaylovskoye, Azerbaijan, a village in Salyan District, Azerbaijan

Other
Mikhailovsky Theatre, an opera and ballet house in St. Petersburg, Russia
Mikhailovsky Palace, several palaces in St. Petersburg, Russia
Mikhaylovskoye Airport, alternative name of the Stavropol Shpakovskoye Airport in Russia
Mikhaylovskoye Museum Reserve, a museum complex in Pskov Oblast, Russia, dedicated to Alexander Pushkin

See also
Michael (disambiguation)
Mikhaylov (disambiguation)
Mikhaylovsk
Mikhaylovka (disambiguation)